Guatteria jefensis is a species of plant in the Annonaceae family. It is endemic to Panama.  It is threatened by habitat loss.

References

jefensis
Endemic flora of Panama
Endangered plants
Endangered flora of North America
Endangered biota of South America
Taxonomy articles created by Polbot